Ligula intestinalis is a tapeworm of fish, fish-eating birds and copepods, with species from each group featuring in its complex life cycle.  Ligula intestinalis is a parasite that changes its intermediate host's behavior to become more vulnerable to its predators. In this case, Ligula intestinalis uses copepods and cyprinid fish as their intermediate host and develops inside of them to get to its final destination which is fish-eating birds. 
 
Plerocercoids, Ligula intestinalis larva, influence secondary intermediate hosts’ behavior, health, and fecundity.
 
Additionally, Ligula intestinalis can cause fish-eating birds' gonads to remain undeveloped.

References

Cestoda